Eucomis zambesiaca is a bulbous plant in the family Asparagaceae, subfamily Scilloideae, native to southern Africa, from Zimbabwe through Malawi to the Limpopo Province of South Africa.

Description
The raceme, which is variable in width, is topped by a head or "coma" of short, somewhat pointed bracts. The species resembles Eucomis autumnalis, but this has flowers that are yellow-green rather than white when fully open and releasing pollen, angled rather than drooping pedicels, and densely packed rather than well spaced individual flowers.

Taxonomy
Eucomis zambesiaca was collected by John Kirk in 1859 while accompanying David Livingstone on an expedition. It was first described scientifically by John Gilbert Baker in 1886. E. zambesiaca is one of the mainly short, diploid species of Eucomis with 2n = 2x = 30 chromosomes.

Distribution and habitat
Eucomis zambesiaca is native to southern Africa, from Zimbabwe through Malawi to the Limpopo Province of South Africa.

Cultivation
Eucomis zambesiaca is grown as an ornamental plant. It has been described as "one of the prettiest species" of Eucomis. It has proved to be frost-hardy in the United Kingdom in well drained soil or dry sites with wall protection. It can also be grown in containers. The bulbs increase readily.

E. zambesiaca 'White Dwarf' is a cultivar listed by the Royal Horticultural Society. It often sold in Europe under the incorrect species name Eucomis autumnalis.

References

Scilloideae
Flora of the Northern Provinces
Flora of Zimbabwe
Flora of Malawi
Plants described in 1886
Taxa named by John Gilbert Baker